Vera Vucheva (born 22 January 1973) is a Bulgarian biathlete. She competed in the women's sprint event at the 1992 Winter Olympics.

References

1973 births
Living people
Biathletes at the 1992 Winter Olympics
Bulgarian female biathletes
Olympic biathletes of Bulgaria
Place of birth missing (living people)